Álvar Núñez Cabeza de Vaca was a Spanish explorer.

Cabeza de Vaca may also refer to:

 Cabeza de Vaca (film), a 1991 Mexican film
 Cabeza de Vaca, Tumbes, a Peruvian archaeological site

 Diego Cabeza de Vaca (d. 1625), Spanish Roman Catholic prelate
 Francisco Javier García Cabeza de Vaca (b. 1967), Mexican politician
 Francisco Vera Cabeza de Vaca (1637–1700), Spanish painter
 Luis Cabeza de Vaca (d. 1550), Bishop of Palencia, Spain
 Martín Cabeza de Vaca, (d. 1534), Spanish Roman Catholic prelate
 The Marquess of Portago family, including:
 Alfonso de Portago (1928-1957),  Spanish aristocrat and sportsperson
 Vicente Cabeza de Vaca y Fernández de Córdoba, Marquis of Portago (1865–1921), Spanish politician
 Rafael Benjumea Cabeza de Vaca (1939–2021), Spanish aristocrat and engineer
 Vicente Sartorius y Cabeza de Vaca (1931–2002), Spanish nobleman and Olympic bobsledder

See also
 Esteban Cabeza de Baca (b. 1985), American artist
 Ezequiel Cabeza De Baca (1864–1917), the first Hispano elected for office as lieutenant governor in New Mexico
 Fabiola Cabeza de Baca Gilbert (1894–1991), American educator
 Luis CdeBaca (b. 1967), American politician